This is a list of Anandians, alumni of the Ananda College, Colombo, Sri Lanka.

Heads of State 

 Gotabaya Rajapaksa - 7th President of Sri Lanka

Heads of Government 

 Ratnasiri Wickremanayake - Prime Minister of Sri Lanka (2000—2001, 2005—2010)

National politics

Heads of Legislature

Ministers and legislators

Current 

Government benches

Opposition benches

Former 
 Ossie Abeygunasekara – former leader of Sri Lanka Mahajana Party
 Thomas Amarasuriya – former Member of the State Council of Ceylon; President of the Senate of Ceylon
 D. P. Atapattu – former Member of Parliament for Beliatte, Secretary to the Minister of State, 1965–70
 R. M. Dharmadasa Banda – ex minister of Agriculture
 Rohitha Bogollagama – former minister of Foreign Affairs; former Member of Parliament
 General Sarath Fonseka – leader of Democratic Party; former Member of Parliament
 Tudor Gunasekara – former Member of Parliament for Mahara Electorate, District Minister for Gampaha; first Sri Lankan Ambassador to Poland, Bulgaria and Romania (note: also listed in "Diplomats")
 Philip Gunawardena – served as Minister of Agriculture in 1956 Cabinet; Minister of Fisheries
 Indradasa Hettiarachchi – former Minister of Industries
 I. M. R. A. Iriyagolla – former Minister of Education
 D. D. Athulathmudali – former Senator
 Prins Gunasekera – former Member of the Parliament
 Lakshman Jayakody – former Sri Lankan Cabinet Minister; Presidential advisor
 V. G. W. Ratnayake – former Sri Lankan MP
 P. B. G. Kalugalla – former Minister of Finance
 Wickremabahu Karunaratne – leader of the Nava Lanka Samasamaja Party; served as a Provincial Councillor representing Colombo District
 P. Kumarasiri- former Member of the Parliament
 Sanjeewa Kavirathna – former Member of Parliament; Member of Central Provincial council; Sri Lanka's first Green Awarded politician
 Weerasinghe Mallimarachchi – former Colombo District Minister; Member of Parliament (Kolonnawa)
 Imthiaz Bakeer Markar – former Cabinet Minister of Media, Postal and Telecommunications
 V. Navaratnam – former Member of Parliament
 Herbert Sri Nissanka – former Member of the Sri Lankan Parliament
 C. E. Attygalle – former Member of the Sri Lankan Parliament
 N. M. Perera – founder and leader of LSSP; former Minister of Finance
 Bharatha Lakshman Premachandra – former Member of Parliament
 V. Karalasingham – former lawyer, writer; politician
 Basil Rajapaksa – former Minister of Economic Development; Member of Parliament
 Prins Gunasekera former Member of the Sri Lankan Parliament
 Gotabaya Rajapaksa – former Secretary of Defense
 Suranimala Rajapaksha – former Minister of School Education
 Lalitha Rajapakse – former Minister of Justice of Ceylon, elected Member of the Senate of Ceylon; former Sri Lankan Ambassador to France; High Commissioner to the United Kingdom
 N. R. Rajavarothiam – Ceylon Tamil politician; former Member of Parliament
 Bimal Rathnayaka – former Member of Parliament
 Dharmasiri Senanayake – former Cabinet Minister of Media, Tourism and Civil Aviation; General Secretary of the Sri Lanka Freedom Party
 William de Silva – former Cabinet Minister of Industries and Fisheries; former Ceylon High Commissioner to Canada
 T. B. Subasinghe – former Speaker of the Parliament; Cabinet Minister of Industries and Scientific Affairs
 Dingiri Bandara Welagedara – former Cabinet Minister of Plan Implementation; former Governor of North Central Province
 S. A. Wickramasinghe – former senator; founder of the Communist Party of Sri Lanka
 V. Yogeswaran – former Member of Parliament
 S. K. K. Suriarachchi - former Member of Sri Lankan Parliament
 G. K. W. Perera - Former Member of the Ceylon State Council
 K. D. David Perera - Former Member of the Sri Lankan Parliament
 Siri Andrahennady - Former Member of the Sri Lankan parliament
 Bernard Soysa - Former Member of the Sri Lankan parliament
 Noel Wimalasena - Former Member of the Sri Lankan parliament
 Piyasena Tennakoon - Former Member of the Sri Lankan parliament
 V. G. W. Ratnayake - Former Member of the Sri Lankan parliament
 C. E. Attygalle - Former Member of the Sri Lankan parliament
 S. A. Peeris - Former Member of the Sri Lankan parliament
 Noel Wimalasena - Former Member of the Sri Lankan parliament from Kandy District
 G. K. W. Perera - Former Member of the Sri Lankan Parliament
 Sanjeeva Kaviratne - Former Member of the Sri Lankan Parliament
 Dayasena Pasqual - Former Member of the Sri Lankan Parliament
 K. D. David Perera - Former Member of the Sri Lankan Parliament
 Noel Wimalasena - Former Member of the Sri Lankan Parliament
 J. D. Weerasekera - Former Member of the Sri Lankan Parliament

Judiciary 

Chief Justice

 G. P. S. de Silva - Chief Justice of the Supreme Court of Sri Lanka
 Arthur Wijewardena - Chief Justice of the Supreme Court of Sri Lanka

Puisne Justice of the Supreme Court 

 - Associate Justice of the Supreme Court of Burma, Attorney General of Burma, architect of the first Constitution of Burma in 1947
 - Former Puisne Justice of the Supreme Court of Sri Lanka
 - Former Puisne Justice of the Supreme Court of Sri Lanka
 - Former Puisne Justice of the Supreme Court of Sri Lanka
 - Puisne Justice of the Supreme Court of Sri Lanka, former President of the Court of Appeal of Sri Lanka

Provincial and Local Government

Diplomats

Armed Forces

Army

Navy

Air Force

Police

Academics

Medicine

Legal

Corporate

Sports

Engineers

Media

Arts

Religion

References 

Ananda college